The 1975–76 Norwegian 1. Divisjon season was the 37th season of ice hockey in Norway. Ten teams participated in the league, and Hasle-Loren Idrettslag won the championship.

Final round

Second round

Final round

Relegation round

External links 
 Norwegian Ice Hockey Federation

Nor
GET-ligaen seasons
1975 in Norwegian sport
1976 in Norwegian sport